Allen LaMar Wilson (June 19, 1939 – April 21, 2008) was an American soul singer known for the million-selling #1 hit, "Show and Tell". He is also remembered for his Northern soul anthem, "The Snake".

Background
Wilson was born in Meridian, Mississippi. Attending Kate Griffin Elementary, he showed little interest in education but performed in school plays, sang in talent shows and won first prize in a local art contest.

He began his career at the age of twelve leading his own spiritual quartet and singing in the church choir, and performing covers of country and western hits. While he was in high school, Wilson and his family relocated to San Bernardino, California, where he worked three jobs as a mail carrier, a janitor, and an office clerk, in addition to teaching himself to play drums.  After graduation he spent four years touring with Johnny Harris and the Statesmen, before joining the U.S. Navy, and singing with an enlisted men's chorus. He also developed his stand-up comedy routine in case he didn't succeed as a singer, and performed at some local clubs.

Career
After a two-year military stint, Wilson settled in Los Angeles, touring the local nightclub circuit before joining the R&B vocal group the Jewels; from there he landed with the Rollers, followed by a stint with the instrumental combo the Souls. In 1966, Wilson signed with manager Marc Gordon, who quickly sought his client an a cappella audition for Johnny Rivers. Wilson was signed to the Soul City imprint and Rivers produced the sessions that yielded the 1968 U.S. R&B hit single "The Snake" (U.S. Pop #27), which became popular on the Northern Soul circuit in the United Kingdom.  It also provided Wilson with his only UK Singles Chart hit, reaching #41 in 1975. The minor hit "Do What You Gotta Do" appeared that same year. In 1969, Wilson charted with his cover of Creedence Clearwater Revival's "Lodi" (U.S. #67), and Rivers' own "Poor Side Of Town" (U.S. #75).

Wilson disappeared from the music industry until 1973, when he released his major hit, "Show And Tell", written and produced by Jerry Fuller, the man behind the run of hit singles by Gary Puckett & The Union Gap in the late 1960s. Topping the Hot 100, the song on the Rocky Road label, owned by his manager, Marc Gordon, also reached #10 in the Billboard R&B chart. The resulting album's success was matched by the single,  which sold well over one million copies and was awarded a gold disc by the R.I.A.A. in December 1973.

"The La La Peace Song", released in 1974, was another success, although O. C. Smith recorded and released a version simultaneously, causing sales of Wilson's version to suffer as a result. Two years later in 1976, Wilson recorded "I've Got a Feeling, We'll Be Seeing Each Other Again" for Playboy Records, produced by his manager, Marc Gordon. Although it reached #3 on the R&B chart, Wilson tried to leave Playboy Records but was unable to get a release from his recording contract. Two years later, the label folded. With 1979's "Count the Days" recorded in Philadelphia for Roadshow Records, Wilson scored his final chart hit and he spent the next two decades touring clubs and lounges. In 2001, he re-recorded his hits for the album Spice of Life.

In March 2007, many of his original master tapes were lost to a fire that swept through his home garage which he had converted into a recording studio.

Wilson's recording of "The Snake" was featured in a Lambrini advert in the UK, as well as in a Pennsylvania Rally by President Donald Trump.

Death
Wilson died on April 21, 2008, of kidney failure, in Fontana, California, at the age of 68. He was buried at the Evergreen Cemetery in Riverside, California.

Discography

Studio albums

Compilation albums

Singles

Notes

References

External links

[ Al Wilson Biography at AMG]
Super Seventies "Show and Tell" Al Wilson
Soul Sounds Al Wilson page
The complete Al Wilson discography at Soul Express

Al Wilson Yahoo group
Al Wilson Myspace (founded May 2008)

1939 births
2008 deaths
20th-century African-American male singers
American soul musicians
Bell Records artists
Playboy Records artists
Wand Records artists
Burials at Evergreen Cemetery (Riverside, California)
Deaths from kidney failure
Northern soul musicians
Musicians from Meridian, Mississippi
20th-century American singers
20th-century American male singers
21st-century African-American people